Collège de Maisonneuve (or Cégep de Maisonneuve) is a francophone public pre-university and technical college located in Montreal, Quebec, Canada.

Partnerships
The College is affiliated with the ACCC, and CCAA.

History

In 1967, several institutions were merged and became public ones, when the Quebec system of public colleges was created. Collège de Maisonneuve was named after Paul Chomedey de Maisonneuve.

On the 5 of May 1973 the Société Générale des Étudiants et Étudiantes du Collège de Maisonneuve (SoGÉÉCoM) is created. It is still the association of Maisonneuve students.

Programs

The college offers two types of programs: pre-university and technical. The pre-university programs, which take two years to complete, cover the subject matters which roughly correspond to the additional year of high school given elsewhere in Canada, as well as an introductory specialization that generally happens in freshman year, in preparation for a chosen field in university. The technical programs, which take three-years to complete, applies to students who wish to pursue a skill trade. In addition Continuing education and services to business are provided.

See also
List of colleges in Quebec
Higher education in Quebec

References

External links
http://www.cmaisonneuve.qc.ca/
https://sogeecom.org/a-propos/histoire/annees-70/

Maisonneuve
Educational institutions established in 1929
Universities and colleges in Montreal
Colleges in Quebec
Mercier–Hochelaga-Maisonneuve
1929 establishments in Quebec